Golden is the second extended play by Californian electronic rock outfit, Parade of Lights. It was the band's first release on Astralwerks after previously self-releasing their previous extended play. The EP was released on March 25, 2014 to iTunes and Spotify.

Track listing

Charting

References

2014 EPs